Hamilton Morris is an Australian character actor. He is a Warlpiri man from the small community of Nyirripi, Northern Territory. He won the 2018 AACTA Award for Best Actor in a Leading Role for his role in Sweet Country.

He was also in the 2015 television series 8MMM Aboriginal Radio.

References

External links 

Living people
Best Actor AACTA Award winners
Indigenous Australian male actors
Male actors from the Northern Territory
Year of birth missing (living people)
Australian male film actors
Australian male television actors